William Templeton Johnson (1877 – 1957) was a notable San Diego architect. He was a fellow to the American Institute of Architects (AIA) in 1939.

Johnson is known for his Spanish Revival buildings, all in San Diego unless otherwise noted:

 La Jolla Public Library, now the La Jolla Athenaeum, 1921
 Fine Arts Gallery in Balboa Park in 1932, now the San Diego Museum of Art, 1926
 La Valencia Hotel, La Jolla, 1926
 The San Diego Trust & Savings Bank at Sixth and Broadway, 1928
 The Serra Museum in Presidio Park, 1929 
 three buildings (one extant) for the Ibero-American Exposition of 1929, Seville, Spain
 Mabel Shaw Bridges Music Auditorium, Pomona College, Claremont, California
 The San Diego Natural History Museum, also in Balboa Park, 1932 
 The San Diego County Administration Center (with other architects)

See also
 El Cid Campeador (sculpture), San Diego, California

References

External links 
 The San Diego Natural History Museum Research Library houses a significant collection of William Templeton Johnson's papers.

Architects from California
1877 births
1957 deaths
People associated with the San Diego Natural History Museum
People from San Diego
Historicist architects
20th-century American architects